The seventh season of La Voz started airing on 11 September 2020 on Antena 3. Antonio Orozco and Pablo López returned as coaches from the previous season, while Laura Pausini and Alejandro Sanz, who lasted coached in season three and four, respectively, returned to replace Paulina Rubio and Luis Fonsi.

Coaches 

On 8 November 2019, it was announced that Pablo López and Antonio Orozco would remain on the panel for the seventh season and would be joined by returning coaches Laura Pausini and Alejandro Sanz who would replace Paulina Rubio and Luis Fonsi who left the panel due to him coaching La Voz US. This season featured a fifth coach for The Comeback Stage, Miriam Rodriguez who selected twelve contestants who did not get a chair turn in the Blind auditions.

The advisors for this season include: Tini Stoessel for Team Alejandro, Sebastián Yatra for Team Pablo, Carlos Rivera for Team Laura, and Mala Rodríguez for Team Antonio.

Teams 
Color key

Blind auditions 
In the Blind Auditions, each coach had to complete their teams with 15 contestants. Each coach had three Blocks to prevent another of the coaches from getting a contestant. Twelve participants who got no chair turn were chosen to participate on The Comeback Stage.

Episode 1 (11 September) 
At the beginning of the episode, the coaches performed each other songs. Alejandro Sanz sang "Estoy hecho de pedacitos de ti", Pablo López sang "Viveme", Laura Pausini sang "El Patio" and Antonio Orozco sang "No Tengo Nada".

Episode 2 (18 September)

Episode 3 (25 September)

Episode 4 (2 October)

Episode 5 (9 October)

Episode 6 (16 October)

Notes 
 In episode 3, the coaches gave Dayana Emma a second chance to perform a new song.
 Laura saw Alejandro blocking her and, therefore, she didn't try to press her button. The block didn't count and Alejandro got the chance to block again.

The Knockouts 
This season, the rules for "Los Asaltos" changed. Each coach had to make three groups of five artists from their team to compete in a Knockout. At the end of all five performances, their coach could only advance with one of the artists. But, each coach has two steals which they can use to steal losing artists from other teams. Coaches received help from their advisors: Tini Stoessel for Team Alejandro, Sebastián Yatra for Team Pablo, Carlos Rivera for Team Laura, and Mala Rodríguez for Team Antonio. At the end of this round, each coach advanced with five artists into the Battles.

The battles 
This round started with the Top 20 and each coach had five contestants. Each one granted an artist the "Fast Pass", who advanced to the Playoffs without battling a team member. The remaining artists battled another team member and only one was chosen to advance. For this round, the advisors from the Knockouts were also present. The "Fast Pass" artist and the two artists from each team who won their battle advanced to the Playoffs.

The Comeback Stage 
For this season, the show added a brand new phase of competition called The Comeback Stage that was exclusive to Atresplayer and show's official YouTube channel. After failing to turn a chair in the blind auditions, artists had the chance to be selected by fifth coach Miriam Rodríguez to become a member of her team.
 In the first phase (which was part of the main show's Blind Auditions segment), after every audition night, the coach chose two no-chair turn artists to compete against each other. Coach Miriam then had the task to choose one to advance into the next round.
 In the second round (which was part of the main show's Knockouts segment), the coach had to create a 3-people Knockout with two of her Round One winners, and one artist she stole from the main competition that night.
 In the third phase, Round Two's winners battled it out and only one won going through to the main competition's Playoffs.
 In round four, Miriam chose an eliminated artist from the main competition's Battles to go into the Playoffs and compete against Round Three's winner.

First round (battles)

Second round (knockouts)

Third round (the finale)

Fourth round (playoffs)

Final phase 
This season, the final phase was pre-recorded, instead of live, due to the ongoing COVID-19 pandemic. During the Playoffs and Semifinal, the public present in the studio voted for their favorites to advance into the next round. In the Finale, they eventually pick who wins the season.

Week 1: Playoffs (20 November) 
The Playoffs started with each team singing a song of their coach. Then, "The Comeback Stage" artists performed and Kelly won with majority of votes from the public; he decided to join Team Laura. Finally, the contestants performed by teams; the public voted for one artist, while each coach chose a second artist to advance into the Semifinal.

Week 2: Semifinal (27 November) 
The Semifinal started with a virtual performance of all sixty artists that were part of this season. Afterwards, each artist performed, as well as each coach performing with their two semifinalists. At the end of the episode, the public voted for their four favorite artists, from any team, to advance to the Finale.

Week 3: Finale (4 December) 
The Finale started with the Top 4 performing together. Afterwards, each artist performed a song in solo and another one with a special guest. At the end of the episode, the public voted for their favorite artist, who was crowned the winner of La Voz 2020. It was not revealed who finished in third place and who finished in fourth, which means the bottom two artists were both considered third placers.

Elimination chart

Color key 
Artist's info

Result details

Overall

Teams

References 

2020 Spanish television seasons
Spain